Mureaumont is a commune in the Oise department in northern France.

Geography
The commune of Mureaumont is close to the border with the Seine-Maritime department.

See also
 Communes of the Oise department

References

Communes of Oise